The graceful honeyeater (Microptilotis gracilis) is a species of bird in the family Meliphagidae. It is found in the Aru Islands, southern New Guinea, and Cape York Peninsula. Its natural habitats are subtropical or tropical moist lowland forest and subtropical or tropical mangrove forest.

References

graceful honeyeater
Birds of the Aru Islands
Birds of New Guinea
Birds of Cape York Peninsula
graceful honeyeater
Taxonomy articles created by Polbot